Wondalli is a rural locality in the Goondiwindi Region, Queensland, Australia. In the  Wondalli had a population of 65 people.

History 
Named and bounded by the Minister for Natural Resources 26 November 1999. Locality re-gazetted by an Amendment Notice published on the 20 January 2012 due to the council amalgamations under the Local Government Reform Implementation Act 2007. Boundary be

Wondalli Creek Provisional School (also called Wondalli Provisional School) opened in 1912 and closed in 1916.

In the  Wondalli had a population of 65 people.

References 

Goondiwindi Region
Localities in Queensland